Liu Renqing (born 4 February 1963) is a Chinese sports shooter. She competed in the women's 10 metre air rifle event at the 1984 Summer Olympics.

References

1963 births
Living people
Chinese female sport shooters
Olympic shooters of China
Shooters at the 1984 Summer Olympics
Place of birth missing (living people)